Joseph "Sepp" Blatter (born 10 March 1936) is a Swiss sports administrator who, from 1998 to 2015, served as the eighth president of FIFA, the world governing body of association football. Before being banned from football for eight years in 2015, Blatter has received numerous honours and awards from nation states, sport governing bodies, special interest groups, universities, and cities.

Individual honours
Individual honours awarded to Blatter include the American Global Award for Peace, and the title of "International Humanitarian of the Year" and the "Golden Charter of Peace and Humanitarianism" from the International Humanitarian League for Peace and Tolerance.

Blatter's efforts for peace have also won him a limited edition watch, the "Dove of Geneva" made by the Swiss watchmakers Quinting.

Blatter has also received Soccerex's "Tenth Anniversary Soccerex Merit Award" and the 'Best World Sports award' from the Graduate School of Business Administration in Zurich, Switzerland, and the South African Ekurhuleni Metropolitan Municipality's 'Golden Key Recognition Trophy'.

Foreign honours
Appointments

Honorary degrees
University of Benin, Benin City, Nigeria, 2011
De Montfort University, Leicester, United Kingdom, 2005 withdrawn 22 December 2015
Nelson Mandela Metropolitan University, Port Elizabeth, South Africa, 2006
International University, Geneva, Switzerland, 2007
Azerbaijan State Academy of Physical Training and Sport, Baku, Azerbaijan 
An honorary diploma from the President of Azerbaijan, Ilham Aliyev.

Honorary citizenships
East Timor made Blatter an honorary citizen in 2011. Blatter has also been awarded honorary citizenships from the cities of Bangkok (2006), Guatemala City and Managua in 2011. Blatter was appointed an honorary citizen of Visp, his hometown in southwestern Switzerland, in 2006.

Sports association honours
Honours from sport governing bodies and associations awarded to Blatter include the Order of Olympic Merit from the International Olympic Committee, the 'Global Award for Peace' from the International Amateur Athletic Association, and honorary memberships of the German Football Association, Swiss Football Association, the Swiss Olympic Association, and Real Madrid C.F. Blatter has also been awarded the 'Necklace of Honour' from the Ecuadorian Football Federation in 2010, the Asian Football Confederation's Diamond of Asia Award in 2006 and UEFA's Order of Merit in Diamond in 2004.

References

 

Blatter, Sepp
honours